The Glatthorn (obsolete: Damülser Horn) in Vorarlberg in Austria is the highest mountain in the Bregenz Forest Mountains with a height of . It lies west of and above the saddle of Faschinajoch, between Damüls to the north and Fontanella in the Großwalsertal to the south.

References 

Mountains of Vorarlberg
Two-thousanders of Austria
Bregenz Forest Mountains
Mountains of the Alps